The 2015 Belgian Super Cup was a football match that was played on 16 July 2015, between Gent, the winners of the 2014–15 Belgian Pro League and 2014–15 Belgian Cup winners Club Brugge. Gent won 1–0, winning the Super Cup for the first time.

Match

Details

See also
2014–15 Belgian Pro League
2014–15 Belgian Cup
2014 Belgian Super Cup

References

2015
Belgian Supercup 2015
Belgian Supercup 2015
Supercup
July 2015 sports events in Europe